The Gonzaga Bulldogs football team represented Gonzaga University of Spokane, Washington, in the sport of college football. Gonzaga last fielded a varsity football team  in 1941. From 1892 to 1941, Gonzaga went  with one bowl appearance, in 1922 in the San Diego East-West Christmas Classic. The Bulldogs lost to the undefeated West Virginia Mountaineers, who claimed a share of the national title that season.

Like many colleges, the Gonzaga football program went on hiatus during World War II (in April 1942), but after the war the administration decided not to resume it. The program had been in financial difficulty prior to the war.

GU's most notable football player was running back Tony Canadeo (1919–2003) from Chicago, who played in the NFL for the Green Bay Packers from 1941 to 1952 and was elected to the Pro Football Hall of Fame in 1974. Ray Flaherty joined him as a hall of famer (as a head coach) in 1976. Flaherty was a Gonzaga teammate of Houston Stockton, a noted halfback in the 1920s (and the paternal grandfather of basketball star John Stockton). Their head coach at Gonzaga was Gus Dorais, who threw to college teammate Knute Rockne at Notre Dame in 1913.

Stadium
The Gonzaga football stadium, built in 1922, was used for city high school football until it was deemed unsafe by the city after the 1947 season. The white-painted wooden venue hosted a professional preseason game in 1946 under the lights, between the New York Yankees and Brooklyn Dodgers of the new All-America Football Conference. High school football moved to Ferris Field in 1948 and to the new Memorial Stadium in 1950, renamed for Gonzaga alumnus Joe Albi in 1962. The Gonzaga Stadium football field is now occupied by the Foley Center Library (1992) and its Foley Lawn.

Head coaching history

All Americans

References

 
American football teams established in 1892
American football teams disestablished in 1941
1892 establishments in Washington (state)
1941 disestablishments in Washington (state)